The Haikou Evening News is a daily Chinese language newspaper published in Haikou City, Hainan Province, China.

References

External links
 Haikou Evening News Online (Simplified Chinese)

Daily newspapers published in China
Mass media in Haikou
Chinese-language newspapers (Simplified Chinese)
Organizations based in Haikou